Akira Kito (born 10 September 1974) is a Japanese table tennis player. He competed in the men's doubles event at the 2004 Summer Olympics, with Toshio Tasaki as his partner. They were eliminated in Round 3.

References

External links
 

1974 births
Living people
Japanese male table tennis players
Olympic table tennis players of Japan
Table tennis players at the 2004 Summer Olympics
Place of birth missing (living people)
Table tennis players at the 2002 Asian Games